Malcolm "Malc" McGookin (born 1956 in Kilwinning, Scotland) is a British cartoonist also known for his work as an animator and illustrator. He immigrated to Australia in 1995 and presently lives in Brisbane, Australia.

Cartooning career

Malc McGookin began cartooning as a teenager working for the Ardrossan and Saltcoats Herald in Scotland. By 18 he had his first regular feature in the British weekly magazine, Tit-Bits. In the late 1970s. After attending college to develop an animation showreel, Malcolm undertook a career at Cosgrove Hall, starting out as an animation assistant, later to become a Key Animator and scriptwriter, a period he still refers to as "the best six years of my professional life". Malcolm emigrated to Australia as an animator and scriptwriter for various TV series, a move he came to regret, later referencing his employers as "the worst TV cartoon producers in the history of the world". Nevertheless, Malcolm loved Australia itself and moved to Queensland, where he returned to drawing gag cartoons and comic strips. To date, his clients have included magazines such as Prospect and Private Eye as well as the now defunct News Of The World and many other Fleet Street papers. Malc presently works as an editorial cartoonist for the Sunday Mail in Brisbane, as well as producing animation for international corporate clients.

Animation career

As an Animation Director
Tabaluga
Samuel and Nina

As a screenwriter
Avenger Penguins
Billy the Cat
Sooty's Amazing Adventures

As an animator
Count Duckula
Crocadoo
Danger Mouse
Digswell Dog Show
Dreamtime Stories
Gloria's House
Li'l Elvis Jones and the Truckstoppers
Skippy: Adventures in Bushtown
Tabaluga
Victor and Hugo
Roald Dahl's The BFG (feature film version)

Other works
Malcolm McGookin has contributed illustrations to the Darwin Awards series of books, as well as the books It's Alive, Felonious Failures, and Warris the Weed.

Personal life
McGookin is married, with three sons, and he has mentioned music and football to be among his hobbies.  He grew up wanting to be a pro footballer, but gave up that ambition in his mid twenties after suffering a serious knee injury during a college fixture. Malcolm continued playing open age amateur football until the age of 40, before switching to coaching football over the last fifteen years. He has recently undertaken his UEFA International Coaching Licence

Books
Cartoon Compilations

Cap'n Codd,  2002. (eBook)
Gobbledegook,  2003. (eBook)

References

Footnotes

External links
 McGookin website of Malcolm McGookin
 Malc McGookin weblog weblog of Malcolm McGookin

1956 births
Living people
Australian editorial cartoonists
British editorial cartoonists
Scottish editorial cartoonists
Australian comic strip cartoonists
British comic strip cartoonists
Australian animators
British animators
Scottish animators
Australian animated film directors
British animated film directors
Scottish animated film directors
British expatriates in Australia
Scottish expatriates in Australia
Australian television writers
British television writers
Scottish television writers
British male television writers
Australian screenwriters
British screenwriters
Scottish screenwriters
People from Kilwinning
Australian male television writers